Isabelle Michel is a Swiss former racing cyclist. She was the Swiss National Road Race champion in 1988.

References

External links

Year of birth missing (living people)
Living people
Swiss female cyclists
Place of birth missing (living people)